César Gerson Loyola Campos (born 13 September 1965) is a Peruvian former footballer who played as a midfielder. He made eleven appearances for the Peru national team from 1983 to 1989. He was also part of Peru's squad for the 1987 Copa América tournament.

References

External links
 

1965 births
Living people
Footballers from Lima
Peruvian footballers
Association football midfielders
Peru international footballers
Sporting Cristal footballers